The American Dental Association (ADA) is an American professional association established in 1859 which has more than 161,000 members. Based in the American Dental Association Building in the Near North Side of Chicago, the ADA is the world's largest and oldest national dental association and promotes good oral health to the public while representing the dental profession.

The ADA publishes a monthly journal of dental related articles named the Journal of the American Dental Association.

Overview

The American Dental Association was founded August 3, 1859, at Niagara Falls, New York, by twenty-six dentists who represented various dental societies in the United States. Today, the ADA has more than 152,000 members, 55 constituent (state-territorial) and 545 component (local) dental societies. It is the largest and oldest national dental association in the world and is committed to both the public and the dental profession.

The association has more than 400 employees at its headquarters in Chicago and its office in Washington, D.C.
The Paffenbarger Research Center (PRC), located on the campus of the National Institute of Standards and Technology (NIST) in Gaithersburg, Maryland, an agency of the American Dental Association Foundation (ADAF) and a Department of the Division of Science.  PRC scientists conduct basic and applied studies in clinical research, dental chemistry, polymer chemistry and cariology, and are used by of the ADA.

Seal of Acceptance
The ADA established rigorous guidelines for testing and advertising of dental products, and the first ADA Seal of Acceptance was awarded in 1931. Today, about 350 manufacturers participate in the voluntary program and more than 1,300 products have received the Seal of Acceptance.

Product manufacturers are charged $14,500 for each product the ADA evaluates.  For products that are approved, manufacturers pay an annual fee of $3,500.  According to the ADA, it does not make a profit from the program.

Organizational structure
The Board of Trustees, the administrative body of the association, is composed of the president, the president-elect, two vice presidents and 17 trustees from each of the 17 trustee districts in the United States. The treasurer and executive director serve as ex officio members.
The House of Delegates, the legislative body of the association, is composed of 460 delegates representing 53 constituent societies, five federal dental services and the American Student Dental Association. The house meets once a year during the association's annual session.

The association's 11 councils serve as policy recommending agencies. Each council is assigned to study issues relating to its special area of interest and to make recommendations on those matters to the Board of Trustees and the House of Delegates.

The association's official publication is the Journal of the American Dental Association. Other publications include the ADA News and the ADA Guide to Dental Therapeutics.

The Commission on Dental Accreditation, which operates under the auspices of the ADA, is recognized by the U.S. Department of Education as the national accrediting body for dental, advanced dental and allied dental education programs in the United States. It is also recognized by 47 individual states.

The ADA formally recognizes nine specialty areas of dental practice: dental public health, endodontics, oral and maxillofacial pathology, oral and maxillofacial surgery, orthodontics and dentofacial orthopedics, pediatric dentistry, periodontics, prosthodontics, and oral and maxillofacial radiology.

The ADA library has an extensive collection of dental literature with approximately 33,000 books and 17,500 bound journal volumes. The ADA library also subscribes to more than 600 journal titles.

The ADA Foundation is the charitable arm of the association. The Foundation provides grants for dental research, education, scholarships, access to care and charitable assistance programs such as relief grants to dentists and their dependents who are unable to support themselves due to injury, a medical condition or advanced age.

Advocacy

The ADA advocates several positions to legislators in the U.S. Congress. Its agenda includes funding dental research into the safety and effectiveness of amalgam and fluoride, supporting student loans and residency programs for future dentists, increased dental coverage from Medicaid and CHIP programs, reducing dental costs through reform of insurance and medical liability and through health information technology, and improving public health through water fluoridation, tobacco control, and disaster planning and response.

In 2021, the Build Back Better legislative package passed the U.S. House of Representatives without an expansion of dental benefits within Medicare. The ADA president, Dr. Cesar R. Sabates, credited this exclusion in part to the ADA's advocacy against this expansion of benefits.

Advertising
Dudley the Dinosaur is an advertising character from the ADA. He is an anthropomorphic T. rex. He lives with his mom, little sister Dee Dee, Grandpa, and baby brother Digby. His friends are other dinosaurs and prehistoric creatures like mammoths and saber tooth tigers. He, his friends, and family teaches children how to have healthy teeth and good oral hygiene in the form of a cartoon character.

The character Dudley the Dinosaur debuted in 1990 and became the nation's first bilingual (English and Spanish) public service campaign for kids. Dudley has appeared in numerous public service announcements on TV, a dozen National Children's Dental Health Month Campaigns, several coloring books and patient education booklets, four animated shorts produced by the ADA and on 2,500 outdoor billboards around the country. Dudley has won over 100 major awards, appeared on mugs and as a doll. He stars in comic books and DVDs available from the ADA.

Timeline
1859: Twenty-six dentists meet in Niagara Falls, New York, and form a professional society, named the American Dental Association.
1860: First ADA constitution and bylaws are adopted.
1897: ADA merges with the Southern Dental Association to form the National Dental Association (NDA).
1908: NDA publishes the first patient dental education pamphlet.
1913: NDA adopts a new constitution and bylaws, establishing the House of Delegates and Board of Trustees.
1913: The Journal of the NDA is first published, under the title, Bulletin of the National Dental Association.
1920: Maude Tanner becomes the first recorded female delegate to the NDA.
1921: During the annual meeting of the NDA, several female dentists meet in Milwaukee and form the Federation of American Women Dentists, now known as the American Association of Women Dentists (AAWD).
1922: NDA is renamed the American Dental Association (ADA).
1928: ADA affiliates with the National Bureau of Standards.
1930: Council of Dental Therapeutics established to oversee the evaluation of dental products. The council establishes the ADA's Seal Program.
1931: First ADA Seal of Approval awarded; ADA headquarters located on north side of Chicago.
1936: ADA Council on Dental Education is formed.
1950: ADA works with Congress to proclaim February 6 as National Children's Dental Health Day; ADA endorses fluoridation.
1964: ADA produces the first color television Public Service Announcement by a non-profit health agency; ADA establishes the ADA Health Foundation, a 501(c)(3) non-profit organization for the purpose of engaging in dental health research and educational programs.
1965: ADA changes its policies to urge the cessation of discrimination based on race, religion, ethnicity or creed among its member groups and affiliates.
1970: ADA News is first published.
1987: ADA Commission on the Young Professional is formed (later becomes the Committee on the New Dentist).
1991: First female ADA president, Dr. Geraldine Morrow, is elected.
1995: ADA Web site, ADA ONLINE, created (later becomes ADA.org)
2002: First Asian-American ADA president, Dr. Eugene Sekiguchi, is elected; he is Japanese-American.
2009: First female ADA executive director is chosen, Dr. Kathleen O'Loughlin.

See also

 Academy of General Dentistry (AGD)
 American Student Dental Association
 Amalgam (dentistry)
 American Society of Dental Surgeons (ASDS)
 Current Dental Terminology
 Dentistry

References

External links

 
American Dental Association Department of Library Services records, 1885-2011 (inclusive), 1925-2011 (bulk). H MS c503. Harvard Medical Library, Francis A. Countway Library of Medicine, Boston, Mass.

Dental organizations based in the United States
Medical and health professional associations in Chicago
Organizations established in 1859
1859 establishments in New York (state)
501(c)(6) nonprofit organizations
Professional associations based in the United States
Professional associations based in Chicago
Professional associations